The second season of the American reality competition series Ultimate Beastmaster premiered exclusively via Netflix's web streaming service on December 15, 2017. The show consists of 10 Beastmaster episodes which were released simultaneously on Netflix worldwide. The show was filmed in Santa Clarita, California, over the course of eight nights.

Hosts
Each country has their own set of two hosts/commentators for the competition. They are as follows:

Not only do each pair of hosts provide color commentary for each of the six localized versions, but the foreign commentators also make appearances in each localized version, with their commentary presented by subtitles. If a contestant completes a course, all hosts' reactions are shown on screen. Furthermore, since all host booths are placed in a row on the Ultimate Beastmaster set, commentators from one localization can easily walk over into the booth of another localized version.

The Beast
The obstacle course for the competition is known as The Beast, and it is divided into 4 Levels. Competitors with the highest scores after each level move on while those with the lowest scores are eliminated. Unlike the previous season, scores accrue on all four levels, with ties decided in favor of the competitor with the lowest time. The obstacles are suspended over a body of red-tinted water referred to as Beast Blood (except for Level 3 which has blue-tinted water and is referred to as the Fuel of the Pyramid) and housed in a giant steel frame that takes the form of a large animal. A competitor is considered to have failed a Level if all four limbs are submerged into the Beast Blood/Fuel of the Pyramid. Failure ends the attempt at the current Level but confers no penalties. Competitors have 1,500 seconds (25 minutes) to complete all four levels.

Level 1
In Level 1 all twelve competitors compete with the top eight scorers moving on. 
 Bite Force - Competitors must scale a 30° platform leading to the Grinders.
 Grinders - Competitors must cross 3 gear-like platforms separated by 6 ft.
 Faceplant - Competitors stand on a narrow platform, hands braced against panels on either side, as they are tilted forward to a 45° angle. They must then jump to a chain and swing to the next obstacle. Unlike last season, the chain never becomes a rope at any point in the season
 Energy Coils -  Competitors must jump across a series of 5 semi-stationary hanging platforms at various heights. The first Point Thruster is located next to a side platform. The coils were placed farther apart for the finals. An additional coil is added if the second path is taken.
At the end of the Energy Coils, there are two different paths taken, depending on the episode.

Path 1
 Dead Bolts -  Competitors must jump across a series of 4 semi-stationary hanging bolts. A Point Thruster is located underneath the second Deadbolt.
 Mag Wall - Competitors navigate horizontally across a climbing wall. Every 2 seconds (1 second for the finals) the magnetic handholds are released and fall into the Beast's blood. The wall features an inversion, from which the competitors must jump to the finishing platform, which is placed farther in the finals. The final Point Thruster is located toward the end of Mag Wall.
A perfect run will give you a score of 120 points.

Path 2
 Blue Energy Coils -  Competitors must jump across a series of 5 additional semi-stationary hanging platforms, though unlike the regular Energy Coils, these are all at the same height and are closer to each other. A Point Thruster is located in between the first two blue coils.
 Sling Shot - Competitors must use their momentum to swing across a trapeze bar.
 Crash Pads - Similar to the Bungee Beds from season 1's Level 3, competitors must traverse two unstable platforms suspended at varying heights by bungee chords. The final Point Thruster is located in between the two Crash Pads.
Each individual portion of an obstacle is worth 5 points allowing for a possible total of 90 or 120 Points, depending on Beast configuration.
A perfect run will give you a score of 130 points. Competitors have 360 seconds (6 minutes) to complete Level 1.

Level 2
In Level 2 the top eight competitors compete, with the top five scorers moving on. All obstacles are lifted from the previous season.
 Spinal Ascent - Competitors must complete a series of vertical jumps, with the largest being 8 feet. Three platforms are fixed, while two are suspended.
 Spinal Descent - Competitors must work their way down through a cable web. A Point Thruster is located at the bottom.
 Stomach Churn - Competitors must traverse three spinning platforms all at varying heights and speeds. The speed of all platforms increases for the finals. A Point Thruster is located next to the second platform.
 Digestive Track - Jumping from the last spinning platform into a tube, competitors must climb the tube before it sinks and jump to the next obstacle. The tube sinks faster in the finals.
 Dreadmills - Competitors must cross a pair of suspended treadmills and leap to a platform. 
 Chain Reaction - Competitors must swing across a series of hanging chains, which are farther for the finals. A Point Thruster is located midway across.
 Vertibrace - Competitors must hop through a series of five suspended vertebrae-shaped hoops and jump to the finish platform. A Point Thruster is located next to the second hoop.
Each individual portion of an obstacle is worth 5 points allowing for a possible total of 155 points. Competitors have 540 seconds (9 minutes) to complete Level 2.

Level 3 (Energy Pyramid)
In Level 3, also known as the Energy Pyramid, the top 5 scorers compete, with the top two advancing to the final level. Unlike the previous season, there is no Easy Way or Hard Way.
 The Ejector - Competitors must mount a 14 MPH (17 MPH for the finals) forward-moving treadmill and attempt to grab a suspended hand-hold (attached to Prism Strike).
 Prism Strike - Competitors must hold onto a hand-hold as it swings through a curved track, then reach for an additional hand-hold located just before the first Coil Crawl. A Point Thruster is located to the side of the first track.
 Coil Crawl - Competitors must work their way through three tubes structure made of pipe and chain before they each sink into the water. A Point Thruster is located after the first Coil Crawl. Each Coil Crawl sinks faster in the finals.
 Hangman- Competitors must scale 17 hanging, triangular rings which retract after a competitor lets go. A Point Thruster is located midway across.
 Pipeline - Competitors must use grip handles to slide up a set of V-shaped bars, like the Weapon in Season 1.
 Climbing Wall - Competitors must climb a wall up to the final platform. A Point Thruster is located at the bottom of the wall.
Individual portions of obstacles are worth 5 points. The highest possible total is 155 points. Competitors have 540 seconds (9 minutes) to complete Level 3.

Level 4
In Level 4 the top two competitors face each other on an eighty-foot climbing wall. Unlike the previous season, scores from the previous levels are kept and there are no Power Taps.
 Ricochet - Competitors navigate back-and-forth between 2 walls.
 Full Tilt - Competitors must scale five blocks with two handholds which tilt down as they grab them.
 Mother Board - Competitors must ascend a large pegboard divided into two sections. Two Point Thrusters are located towards the top and bottom,
 Sky Hook - Competitors must cross six hooks with two handholds.
 Ventilator - Competitors must ascend a narrow vertical crevice. A Point Thruster is located midway up with a final Point Thruster at the top of this section worth 200 points.
Competitors are given five minutes to accrue the highest possible score, with ties decided in favor of the competitor who is currently highest on the tower. There is no failure condition for Level 4, and competitors may attempt to regain their footing if they lose grip on the wall.

Episodes
 The contestant was named Beastmaster.
 The contestants completed that level.
 The contestant was eliminated on that round.

Episode 1: The Beast Within

Competitors
 Mickaël Mawem, 26 Professional Boulderer - Team France - Beastmaster
0:22 faster
 Bassa Mawem, 32 Professional Speed Climber - Team France - Eliminated on Level 4
 Luca Rinaldi, 26 Land Surveyor - Team Italy - Eliminated on Level 3
 Felix Chu, 33 Obstacle Course Racer - Team USA - Eliminated on Level 3
 Alex Segura, 22 Marketing Student - Team Spain - Eliminated on Level 3
 Dong Li, 25 Parkour Instructor - Team China - Eliminated on Level 2
 Gianni Guglielmo, 33 Taekwondo Champion - Team Italy - Eliminated on Level 2
 Vishwanath Bhaskar, 25 Powerlifting Champion - Team India - Eliminated on Level 2
 Vikas Krishan Yadav, 25 Olympic Boxer - Team India - Eliminated on Level 1
 Lorena González, 34 Nurse - Team Spain - Eliminated on Level 1
 Jessica Hill, 27 Professional Acrobat - Team USA - Eliminated on Level 1
 Dan Zeng, 39 Financial Advisor - Team China - Eliminated on Level 1

Level 1

Level 2

Level 3

Level 4

Episode 2: Out for Blood

Competitors
 Haibin Qu, 24 Rock Climbing Instructor - Team China - Beastmaster
0:02 faster
 Miguel Espada, 24 Stuntman - Team Spain - Eliminated on Level 4
 Remi Fantino, 30 Dentist - Team France - Eliminated on Level 3
 Gabe Baker, 25 Civil Engineer - Team USA - Eliminated on Level 3
 Laura Mété, 28 Pole Dance Instructor - Team France - Eliminated on Level 3
 Antonio Bosso, 21 Youth Leader - Team Italy - Eliminated on Level 2
 Natalie Strasser, 31 Stuntwoman - Team USA - Eliminated on Level 2
 Sumir Kapoor, 25 B-Boy Dancer - Team India - Eliminated on Level 2
 Peng Wu, 27 Personal Trainer - Team China - Eliminated on Level 1
 Lluís Barbé, 35 Physiotherapist - Team Spain - Eliminated on Level 1
 Aditya Shroff, 38 Film Distributor - Team India - Eliminated on Level 1
 Arianna Bonardi, 25 Bodybuilder - Team Italy - Eliminated on Level 1

Level 1

Level 2

Level 3

Level 4

Episode 3: Taming the Beast

Competitors 
 Kyle Soderman, 22 Obstacle Course Coach - Team USA - Beastmaster
 Yoann Leroux, 30 Professional Freerunner - Team France - Eliminated on Level 4
 Yunpeng Zhang, 23 Stuntman - Team China - Eliminated on Level 3
 Tiziano Battista, 27 Body Shop Mechanic - Team Italy - Eliminated on Level 3
 Rishi Prasad, 27 ER Doctor - Team India - Eliminated on Level 3
 Aitor Dominguez, 30 Physiotherapist - Team Spain - Eliminated on Level 2
 Jeremey Adam Rey, 23 Dance Instructor - Team USA - Eliminated on Level 2
 Lisa Sarcinelli, 35 Parkour Gym Owner - Team Italy - Eliminated on Level 2
 Francisco Gascó, 32 Paleontologist - Team Spain - Eliminated on Level 1
 Mathilde Becerra, 25 Professional Climber - Team France - Eliminated on Level 1
 Feng Wan, 36 Climbing Gym Manager - Team China - Eliminated on Level 1
 Urmi Kothari, 31 Fitness Trainer - Team India - Eliminated on Level 1

Level 1 
Level 1 Configuration: Bite Force, Grinders, Faceplant, Energy Coils, Dead Bolts, Mag Wall

Level 2

Level 3

Level 4

Episode 4: The Heart of the Beast

Competitors
 Yiqi Li, 24 Parkour Instructor - Team China - Beastmaster 
 Brian Ludovici, 19 Physics Student - Team USA - Eliminated on Level 4 
 Alex Picazo, 31 Wrestling Coach - Team USA - Eliminated on Level 3 
 Mujahid Habib, 24 Architect - Team India - Eliminated on Level 3 
 Valentin Dubois, 25 Parkour Athlete - Team France - Eliminated on Level 3 
 Jianguo Fang, 27 Personal Trainer - Team China - Eliminated on Level 2 
 Matteo Della Bordella, 32 Professional Alpinist - Team Italy - Eliminated on Level 2 
 Raúl Beltrán, 28 Navy Search and Rescue - Team Spain - Eliminated on Level 2 
 TJ García, 34 Physiotherapist - Team Spain - Eliminated on Level 1 
 Ritesh Shaiwal, 29 Mountaineer - Team India - Eliminated on Level 1 
 Sandra Large, 33 Nanny - Team France - Eliminated on Level 1 
 Serena Jura, 30 Obstacle Race Trainer - Team Italy - Eliminated on Level 1

Level 1

Level 2

Level 3

Level 4

Episode 5: The Beast Gets Schooled

Competitors 
 John Gerzik, 31 High School Physics Teacher - Team USA - Beastmaster
 Alberto Cipriano, 22 Optometrist - Team Italy - Eliminated on Level 4
 Shuai Tian, 32 Noodle Bar Owner - Team China - Eliminated on Level 3
 Cyrus Khan, 20 Physics Student - Team India - Eliminated on Level 3
 Lorenzo Russo, 29 Tattoo Artist - Team Italy - Eliminated on Level 2
 Jiebin Huang, 20 Kinesiology Student - Team China - Eliminated on Level 2
 Crystal Demopoulos, 28 MMA Fighter - Team USA - Eliminated on Level 2
 Pedro Carrasco, 31 Aerial Acrobat - Team Spain - Eliminated on Level 2 with Injury
 Claire Buat, 23 Parkour Teacher - Team France - Eliminated on Level 1
 Remi Papalia, 28 Firefighter - Team France - Eliminated on Level 1
 Andrea Montero, 25 OCR Athlete - Team Spain - Eliminated on Level 1
 Neeraj Goyat, 24 Boxer - Team India - Eliminated on Level 1

Level 1

Level 2

Level 3

Level 4

Episode 6: The Battle Rages On

Competitors 
 Bin Xie, 24 Ex-Navy Special Ops - Team China - Beastmaster
 Clément Dumais, 23 Parkour Athlete - Team France - Eliminated on Level 4
 Marc Vela, 22 Pole Vault Champion - Team Spain - Eliminated on Level 3
 Minghua He (Andy), 20 Business Student - Team China - Eliminated on Level 3
 Giles D'Souza, 27 Special Forces Trainer - Team India - Eliminated on Level 3
 Andres Encinales, 28 MMA Fighter/Naval Officer - Team USA - Eliminated on Level 2
 Samuel Muñoz, 40 Firefighter - Team Spain - Eliminated on Level 2
 Abhinav Mahajan, 25 Motivational Speaker - Team India - Eliminated on Level 1 with Injury
 Myra Robinson, 34 Foster Parent - Team USA - Eliminated on Level 1
 Aude Brignone, 24 IT Saleswoman - Team France - Eliminated on Level 1
 Francesca Indelicato, 21 Wrestler - Team Italy - Eliminated on Level 1
 Pietro Lalla, 43 Hip Hop Dancer - Team Italy - Eliminated on Level 1
5:00 Time Limit on Level 4

Level 1

Level 2

Level 3

Level 4

Episode 7: Scaling the Beast

Competitors 
 Manuel Cornu, 22 Professional Boulderer - Team France - Beastmaster
0:03 faster
 Axel Dupre, 28 Parkour Instructor - Team France - Eliminated on Level 4
 Juan Andres Villa, 34 Wind Turbine Technician - Team Spain - Eliminated on Level 3
 Gabriele Consentino, 26 Professional Swimmer - Team Italy - Eliminated on Level 3
 Praveen CM, 31 Rock Climbing Instructor - Team India - Eliminated on Level 3
 Alejandro Valdivia, 35 Chef - Team USA - Eliminated on Level 2
 Kraig Shorter, 32 Church Worship Leader - Team USA - Eliminated on Level 2
 Hao Zhao, 32 Marketing Executive - Team China - Eliminated on Level 2
 Chopsy Singh, 30 Fashion Designer - Team India - Eliminated on Level 1
 Nerea Povedano, 32 Ballet Dancer - Team Spain - Eliminated on Level 1
 Changying Wang, 33 Insurance Sales - Team China - Eliminated on Level 1
 Anna Aita, 29 Pole Dancer - Team Italy - Eliminated on Level 1

Level 1

Level 2

Level 3

Level 4

Episode 8: Trapping the Beast

Competitors
 Bin Fang, 24 Online Retailer - Team China - Beastmaster
 Jian Cui, 26 Stuntman - Team China - Eliminated on Level 4
 Léopold Hurbin, 23 Parkour Athlete - Team France - Eliminated on Level 3
 Luke Russell, 28 Air Force Medic- Team USA - Eliminated on Level 3
 Grégoire Rezzonico, 23 Obstacle Course Racer - Team France - Eliminated on Level 3
 Alejandra de Castro, 36 OCR Coach - Team Spain - Eliminated on Level 2
 Mauro Pala, 30 Breakdance Instructor - Team Italy - Eliminated on Level 2
 Delson D'Sousa, 28 Stunt Coordinator - Team India - Eliminated on Level 2
 Pablo Sendra, 28 Physical Education Teacher - Team Spain - Eliminated on Level 1
 Alan Rimondi, 28 Personal Trainer - Team Italy - Eliminated on Level 1
 Amanda Cass, 27 Karate Instructor - Team USA - Eliminated on Level 1
 Shruti Kotwal, 24 Speed Skater - Team India - Eliminated on Level 1

Level 1

Level 2

Level 3

Level 4

Episode 9: Making the Cut

Competitors
 Alberto Gotta, 24 Robotics Engineering Student - Team Italy - Beastmaster
 Mehdi Hadim, 21 Economics Student - Team France - Eliminated on Level 4
 Alessio Recchiuto, 20 Street Artist - Team Italy - Eliminated on Level 3
 Nabil Hadim, 21 Acrobat - Team France - Eliminated on Level 3
 Jorge Martin, 23 Teacher - Team Spain - Eliminated on Level 3
 Julio Montenegro Jr., 21 Motivational Speaker - Team USA - Eliminated on Level 2
 Colt Scott, 22 Poly-Sci Student - Team USA - Eliminated on Level 2
 Nupur Shikhare, 30 Celebrity Fitness Trainer - Team India - Eliminated on Level 2
 Biligetu Zhang, 26 Fitness Coach - Team China - Eliminated on Level 1
 Shweta Mehta, 28 Bikini Fitness Model - Team India - Eliminated on Level 1
Miriam Gutiérrez, 33 Boxer - Team Spain - Eliminated on Level 1
 Bin Xu, 34 Ad Agency Copywriter - Team China - Eliminated on Level 1

Level 1

Level 2

Level 3

Level 4

Episode 10: A Beastmaster Is Crowned

Competitors
 Haibin Qu, 24 Rock Climbing Instructor  - Team China - Episode 2 - Ultimate Beastmaster
0:04 faster
 Manuel Cornu, 22 Professional Climber - Team France - Episode 7 - Eliminated on Level 4
 Kyle Soderman, 22 Obstacle Course Coach - Team USA - Episode 3 - Eliminated on Level 3
 John Gerzik, 31 High school Physics Teacher - Team USA - Episode 5 - Eliminated on Level 3
 Yiqi Li , Parkour Instructor - Team China - Episode 4 - Eliminated on Level 2
 Bin Fang, 24 Online Retailer - Team China - Episode 8 - Eliminated on Level 2
 Bin Xie, 24 Ex-Navy Special Ops - Team USA - Episode 6 - Eliminated on Level 1
 Mickael Mawem, 26 Professional Boulderer  - Team Spain - Episode 1 - Eliminated on Level 1
 Alberto Gotta, 24 Robotics Engineering Student - Team Italy - Episode 9 - Eliminated on Level 1

Level 1

Level 2

Level 3

Level 4

Broadcast
The show has six country-specific versions. These have separate hosts, and languages, with two competitors from each country competing in each of the first nine episodes of the series. The countries are the U.S., Spain, France, Italy, China, and India.

The hosts for the show are Tiki Barber and Chris Distefano (U.S.); Paula Vázquez and Saúl Craviotto (Spain); Gilles Marini and Sandy Heribert (France); Francesco Facchinetti and Bianca Balti (Italy); Bin Gu and Qinyi Du (China); and Vidyut Jammwal and Sarah Jane Dias (India).

References

2017 American television seasons